Igor Sijsling (born 18 August 1987) is a Dutch former professional tennis player. Sijsling reached his career-high ATP singles ranking of World No. 52 on 17 February 2014. His biggest accomplishment is reaching the final of Australian Open Doubles with countryman Robin Haase in 2013, where they lost to the Bryan Brothers. In singles, he reached the third round of the 2013 Wimbledon Championships and has victories over top players including Jo-Wilfried Tsonga, Milos Raonic and Mikhail Youzhny. After the end of his career, Sijsling became coach to Tim van Rijthoven.

Personal life
Sijsling grew up in Amsterdam, where his Serbian mother tried to instill her love of sports in her son. He played all kinds of sports as a young child, street football, basketball, and tennis. He even studied ballet.

He started playing tennis at the age of five with his parents, studying at the Amstelpark tennis school. By the time he was 12, tennis was clearly his sport. He was chosen for the Dutch national youth team. He won the Dutch under-18 championship twice and was runner-up at the European under-18 championships in Switzerland.

He received his diploma from the Vossius Gymnasium and began to play on the Futures and Challenger tours in 2006.

He was coached by Dennis Schenk.

Professional career

2012 

Sijsling's first success on the ATP tour came in 2011, when he reached the quarterfinals in Metz, losing to Ivan Ljubičić.

In 2012, he again reached the quarterfinals in s-Hertogenbosch, after beating Jarkko Nieminen and Olivier Rochus in the first two rounds. He was beaten by David Ferrer. He qualified for the US Open that year and reached the second round of the main draw, where he again lost to Ferrer. In Kuala Lumpur, he again reached the quarterfinals, falling yet again to Ferrer. He reached the second round in Moscow and Paris-Bercy, falling to Andreas Seppi and Janko Tipsarević, respectively. In doubles, he reached the quarterfinals in Rotterdam, partnering Thomas Schoorel. He also reached the quarterfinals in Moscow, partnered with Roberto Bautista Agut.

2013 

In 2013, he qualified in Auckland and beat Dutch no. 1 Robin Haase in the first round, only to fall to Tommy Haas in the second. He also reached the second round in Zagreb. At the Australian Open, he teamed with Robin Haase to reach the doubles final, losing to the Bryan brothers. In Rotterdam, Sijsling beat Jo-Wilfried Tsonga in the first round for his first top-10 victory. At Wimbledon, Sijsling had his best showing in the singles tournament of a Grand Slam event by reaching the third round, beating seeded player Grigor Dimitrov in the process.

2014 
Igor prepared for the first Grand Slam tournament of the season with two warm-up tournaments, in Brisbane, where he lost in the first round to Nicolas Mahut, followed by the Heineken Open, where he again lost in the first round, this time to eventual finalist Lu Yen-hsun. At the Australian Open, he lost to Australian wildcard Thanasi Kokkinakis in the first round. The following week he played in a Challenger event in Heilbronn, where he made the final, losing to home favourite Peter Gojowczyk in straight sets. In Zagreb he entered the tournament as the eighth seed. He beat Kavčič in the first round, but lost to Russian qualifier Andrey Kuznetsov in the second.

Sijsling played his first ATP World Tour 500 series event of the year as a wildcard in Rotterdam, beating seventh seed and world no. 15 Mikhail Youzhny in the first round, losing just four games in the process. He defeated qualifier Michael Berrer and Philipp Kohlschreiber to reach the semifinals.

Career finals

Grand Slam finals

Doubles: 1 (0–1)

ATP Tour finals

Doubles: 4 (1–3)

ATP Challenger and ITF Futures finals

Singles: 38 (20–18)

Doubles: 24 (11–13)

Performance timelines

Singles

Doubles

References

External links

 Official website 
 
 
 

1987 births
Living people
Dutch male tennis players
Tennis players from Amsterdam
Dutch people of Serbian descent